The Provincial Secretary of Quebec was a senior position in the provincial cabinet of Quebec from before Canadian Confederation until the 1970.

The Provincial Secretary and Registrar was originally the second highest position in the provincial cabinet, equivalent to the position of Deputy Premier. The Provincial Secretary was the equivalent of the former Canadian Cabinet position of Secretary of State for Canada.

Pre-Confederation Provincial Secretary
Prior to Confederation and the creation of the office of Premier, the Provincial Secretary was the most important and powerful figure in provincial politics. The title holder was appointed by the Lieutenant Governor and many sat as members of the Legislative Council.

Lower Canada

 John Ready (1818-1822)
 Sir Dominick Daly (1827-1840)

Canada East

 Sir Dominick Daly (1843-1844)

United Provinces of Canada
 Sir Dominick Daly (1844-1848)
 Pierre Joseph Olivier Chauveau (1853-1854) Conservative
 Sir George-Étienne Cartier (1855-1857) Conservative

Provincial Secretary and Registrar of Quebec
 Pierre-Joseph-Olivier Chauveau (1867-1873) Conservative 
 Gedeon Ouimet (1873-1874) Conservative
 Charles-Eugène Boucher de Boucherville (1874-1876) Conservative
 Joseph-Adolphe Chapleau (1876-1878) Conservative
 Félix-Gabriel Marchand 1878-1879 Conservative
 Alexandre Chauveau (1879) Liberal
 Étienne-Théodore Pâquet 1879-1882 Conservative
 Jean Blanchet (1882-1887) Conservative
 Charles-Antoine-Ernest Gagnon (1887-1890) Liberal
 Joseph-Émery Robidoux (1890) Liberal
 Charles Langelier (1890–1891) Liberal

Provincial Secretary of Quebec
 Louis-Philippe Pelletier (1891-1896) Conservative
 Michael Felix Hackett (1896-1897) Conservative
 Felix-Gabriel Marchand (1897) Liberal
 Joseph-Émery Robidoux (1897-1901) Liberal
 Adélard Turgeon (1901-1902) Liberal
 Amédée Robitaille (1902-1905) Liberal
 Louis-Rodolphe Roy (1905-1909) Liberal
 Louis-Jérémie Décarie (1909–1919) Liberal
 Athanase David (1919–1936) Liberal
 Charles-Auguste Bertrand (1936)
 Albiny Paquette (1936-1939) Union Nationale
 Henri Groulx (1939-1940) Liberal
 Hector Perrier (1940-1944)
 Omer Côté (1944-1956) Union Nationale
 Romeo Lorrain (1956) Union Nationale
 Yves Prevost (1956–1960) Union Nationale
 Lionel Bertrand (1960-1963) Liberal
 Bona Arsenault (1963–1966) Liberal
 Yves Gabias (1966-1968) Union Nationale
 Rémi Paul (1968–1970) Union Nationale

See also

 Provincial Secretary and Registrar of Ontario

Political history of Quebec
Former ministerial positions in the government of Quebec

1970 disestablishments in Quebec
1867 establishments in Quebec